San Pablo (Spanish for Saint Paul) is a neighbourhood of Asunción, Paraguay.

Demographics
According to the last census made by the DGEEC, the governmental institution that runs censuses and official surveys in the country, in 2002, San Pablo is the most populated neighbourhood in the city, with 21.787 inhabitants.

References

Neighbourhoods of Asunción